The Shore Kiosk was a structure directly located at the banks of the Bosphorus, Istanbul, and served as a pleasure building for the Ottoman Padishah.

Literature 
 Fanny Davis. Palace of Topkapi in Istanbul. 1970. ASIN B000NP64Z2

Topkapı Palace
Bosphorus